Women's Image Network (WIN) is a charity that produces The Women's Image Awards, "Advancing a gender-balanced world and increasing the value of women and girls by celebrating outstanding film and television." The awards show is produced during the Hollywood awards season to promote deserving media and drive attention to feature films also contending for Golden Globe and Academy Awards.

WIN was founded in 1993 to promote gender parity because, to the extent that women's voices remain silent, everyone is robbed of their contribution. Its founder, film producer and director Phyllis Stuart, known for her films Wild Daze and Bert Stern: The Original Madman made WIN successful through the ongoing support, advice and assistance of many seasoned entertainment professionals including Sherry Lansing and Arthur Hiller, two of WIN's founding advisory board members.

Selecting only media submitted from film studios and television networks, their jury adjudicates and nominates work which either tells a dimensional female character's story or nominates work that is produced, written or directed by a woman. In this way, these awards celebrate both male and female artists whose film and television work also increases the value of women and girls.

In addition to awarding nominated film and television work, WIN honors deserving individuals, including Lauren Bacall, Senator Barbara Boxer, Lily Tomlin, Cecilia DeMille Presley, Abigail Disney, Ambassador Swanee Hunt, Suzanne Roberts, Maria Arena Bell, Diane Ladd, Jane Campion, Anne Archer, Carrie Fisher and Irena Medavoy, among others.

The WIN Awards 1993
In 1993, WIN held its first awards ceremony, honoring Tichi Wilkerson Kassel with a Lifetime Achievement Award. Tichi was the first female publisher of The Hollywood Reporter and co-founder of Women In Film. Her friend Charles Champlin (a former Los Angeles Times arts editor and film critic) presented her award. Film producer Laura Ziskin (Spider-Man) (who also founded Stand Up to Cancer before she succumbed to the disease at age 61) was honored that same year and her former boss, producer Jon Peters, presented her Woman of The Year tribute.

The WIN Awards 1994
In 1994, for WIN, producer Phyllis Stuart created and executive-produced the ABC Primetime Special "Fifty Years of Funny Females" starring John Ritter, Annie Potts, Paula Poundstone, Debbie Allen and Pam Stone. This clip show aired twice on ABC and again on Lifetime Television.

The WIN Awards 1999
For four years, The WIN Awards coincided with The WIN Femme Film Festival created to support emerging and/or first-time filmmakers.
WinFemme Film Festival Wants Women's Stories

The WIN Femme Film Festival programmed independently produced short films, documentary feature films and full-length feature films which told a woman's story, had a female protagonist, but which were created either by male or female artists. Best documentary went to Paolo di Florio for her film, Speaking In Strings.. WIN created this festival to help filmmakers find distribution, get agents and win other awards; Speaking In Strings went on to win an Academy Award nomination. Director John Putch (son of Jean Stapleton) won best feature with Valerie Flake starring Susan Traylor (wife of Bob Dylan's son director, Jesse Dylan) who also garnered a Spirit Award for best actress.

The WIN Awards 2000
Actress Lauren Bacall accepted WIN's first Living Legend tribute. That night New Zealand film director Jane Campion was also honored and her Piano film star Sam Neill accepted her tribute on her behalf.

The WIN Awards 2001
Both Lynn Redgrave (Living Legend) and Pierce Brosnan (Humanitarian) were honorees. A few presenters were Lisa Gay Hamilton, Gavin Scott, and Allana Ubach.

The WIN Awards 2001 winners
 DRAMA SERIES Gilmore Girls, "Rory's Dance"
 DRAMA SERIES ACTRESS Dana Delany, Family Law, "Safe At Home"
  DRAMA SERIES ACTOR Jared Padalecki, Gilmore Girls, "Rory's Dance"
 DRAMA SERIES WRITER Amy Sherman-Palladino, Gilmore Girls, "Rory's Dance"
 DRAMA SERIES DIRECTOR Andew J. Robinson Judging Amy, "Treachery of Compromise"
 COMEDY SERIES Ally McBeal - "The Last Virgin"
 COMEDY SERIES ACTRESS Cynthia Nixon, Sex and the City, "My Motherboard My Self"
 COMEDY SERIES ACTOR Robert Downey Jr., Ally McBeal, "The Last Virgin"
 COMEDY SERIES WRITER David E. Kelley, Ally McBeal, "Reason to Believe"
 COMEDY SERIES DIRECTOR Lesli Linka Glatter, Gilmore Girls, "Rory's Dance"
 MADE FOR TELEVISION MOVIE / MINI-SERIES A HOUSE DIVIDED (Showtime)
 MADE FOR TELEVISION MOVIE / MINI-SERIES ACTRESS Lisa Gay Hamilton, A House Divided (Showtime)
 MADE FOR TELEVISION MOVIE / MINI-SERIES ACTOR Michael Byrne, The Mists of Avalon (Turner Network Television)
 WRITER MADE FOR TELEVISION MOVIE / MINI-SERIES Gavin Scott, The Mists of Avalon (Turner Network Television)
 DIRECTOR MADE FOR TELEVISION MOVIE / MINI-SERIES Uli Edell, The Mists of Avalon (Turner Network Television)
 TV DAYTIME SERIES The Zeta Project, "The Accomplice"
 ACTRESS TV DAYTIME SERIES Julie Nathanson, "The Zeta Project", "The Accomplice"
 REALITY SERIES Celebrity Profile: Sarah Ferguson (E! Entertainment)
 NEWS SERIES NBC News: The Odyssey Producer: Esther Zucker, Correspondent: Dennis Murphy
 FEATURE FILM Nurse Betty (USA FILMS)
 ACTRESS FEATURE FILM Reese Witherspoon Legally Blonde (MGM)
 ACTOR FEATURE FILM Luke Wilson, Legally Blonde (MGM)
 WRITER FEATURE FILM Karen McCullah Lutz, Kirsten Smith Legally Blonde (MGM)
 DIRECTOR FEATURE FILM Neil LaBute Nurse Betty (USA Films)

The WIN Awards 2002
Actress Lily Tomlin was honored as a Lifetime Achievement honoree. In lieu of a tribute video, Tomlin was applauded with 'Lily Love Letters' sent from famous friends and serenaded by director David O. Russell. Ruth Buzzi of Laugh In presented.

Presenters included Laraine Newman, Kathy Najimy, Ruth Buzzi, Doris Roberts, Melissa Joan Hart, Anne-Marie Johnson, Arthur Hiller, Dava Savel, Sally Kirkland and Alex Ben Block.

Winners
 Drama Series Alias Creator J. J. Abrams
 Actress Drama Series Jennifer Garner, Alias
 Actor Drama Series Victor Garber Alias
 Comedy Series The Simpsons Executive Producer Al Jean
 Actress Animated Series Kathy Najimy The King of The Hill
 Children's Programming Justice League Producers Bruce Timm, Glen Murakami, Rich Fogel, James Tucker
 Actress Animated Series Julie Nathanson The Zeta Project
 Actor Animated Series Diedrich Bader The Zeta Project
 Documentary Films Beneath The Veil Producer and Journalist Saira Shah & Sheryl Crow: Behind The Music Producers, Paul Gallagher, Justin Sturken, Mark Ford, Andrea Buchanan, Jill Modabber
 News Good Morning America-LA Dodgers Fan Producer Bill Cunningham
 Feature Film Amélie
 Actor Feature Film Ryan Phillippe
  Actress Feature Film Audrey Tautou Amélie

The WIN Awards were part of the closing night of the final WinFemme Film Festival. The three filmmaker Audience Award winners were: (Feature Film), "Controlled Chaos", director, Azita Zendel, (Documentary Feature) Searching For Paradise, director, Binnur Karaevli and (Short Film), Katherine, director, Mary Louise Stoughton.

The WIN Awards 2003
Hosted by Will Sasso and Sara Rue, producer Lauren Shuler Donner received a Lifetime Achievement Award from presenter Rachel Weisz.

Held at the historic Culver City Studios, director Vicky Jensen (Shrek) was honored with WIN's first Kiera Chaplin Limelight directing award. British model and actress Kiera Chaplin is the granddaughter of Charlie Chaplin and great-granddaughter of playwright Eugene O'Neill.

Presenters and guests included Carrie Fisher, Richard Donner, Bonnie Palef, Peter Guber, Yeardley Smith, Melissa Joan Hart, Brittany Snow, Holliston Coleman, Al Jean, Sarah Ramos, Sean Patrick Thomas, Jane Anderson, Valarie Pettiford, Dayna Devon, Neal McDonough, Charlie Robinson and Suzanne Sena.

Winners
 Drama Series Crossing Jordan "Cruel and Unusual" (NBC)
 ACTRESS DRAMA SERIES Sarah Ramos American Dreams "Act of Contrition"
 ACTOR DRAMA SERIES Miguel Ferrer Crossing Jordan "Cruel and Unusual"
 COMEDY SERIES Less Than Perfect "Ice Cream With Lydia" (Touchstone Television)
 ACTRESS COMEDY Series Sara Rue Less than Perfect "Ice Cream With Lydia"
 ACTOR COMEDY SERIES Eric Roberts Less than Perfect "Ice Cream With Lydia"
 REALITY SERIES Controversy: The Pill (Country Music Television)
 ANIMATION KIM POSSIBLE "Crush" (Walt Disney TV Animation)
 ACTRESS ANIMATION SERIES Kathy Najimy King of the Hill "Queasy Rider"
 ACTOR ANIMATION SERIES Dan Castellaneta The Simpsons 'Scuse Me While I Kiss The Sky'
 NEWS SERIES ABC NEWS: 20/20 "The Osbournes" (ABC)
 A FILM OR SHOW DIRECTED BY A WOMAN Pam Veasey The District "Blood Lines"
 MADE FOR TELEVISION MOVIE / MINI-SERIES Normal (HBO)
 ACTRESS MADE FOR TELEVISION MOVIE / MINI-SERIES Romola Garai I Capture the Castle
 ACTOR FEATURE FILM Tom Wilkinson Normal (HBO)

The WIN Awards 2004
WIN added advertising awards with advertising industry artists judges like Charlotte Moore, Sally Hogshead, Amee Shah, Ellen Steinberg, Joyce King Thomas, Liz Paradise (Jury Chair) and David Oakley.

Winners
 ANIMATION SERIES THE FAIRLY ODD PARENTS 'Miss Dimmsdale', Nickelodeon, Producers: Fred Seibert, Butch Hartman, Bob Boyle, Steve Marmel
 ACTOR ANIMATION SERIES Mike Judge KING OF THE HILL "Ceci N'est Pas Une"
 ACTRESS ANIMATION SERIES Melissa Disney AS TOLD BY GINGER "No Turning Back"
 COMEDY SERIES: LIFE WITH BONNIE "The Merry Ole Land of Oz", Bob & Alice Productions/ Touchstone Television, Director: Bonnie Hunt, Writers: Bonnie Hunt, Don Lake, Producers: Bonnie Hunt, Don Lake, Norma Safford Vela, Frank Mula
 COMEDY SERIES-ACTOR Zachary Levi, Less Than Perfect "Roomies,"
 COMEDY SERIES ACTRESS Sarah Jessica Parker Sex And The City "An American Girl In Paris (Part Deux)"
 MADE FOR TV MOVIE / MINI SERIES IRON JAWED ANGELS Spring Creek Productions/HBO Films, Writers: Jennifer Friedes (story), Sally Robinson (screenplay), Director: Katja von Garnier
 ACTOR MADE FOR TELEVISION MOVIE / MINI SERIES Patrick Dempsey Iron Jawed Angels
 ACTRESS MADE FOR TELEVISION MOVIE / MINI SERIES Mary-Louise Parker Angels in America
 DOCUMENTARY FILM THE DAY I WILL NEVER FORGET Cinemax Reel Life, Producer: Kim Longinotto
 NEWS SERIES ABC Primetime Thursday Charlize Theron Correspondent, Diane Sawyer, Producers, Jacqueline Payson, David Doss, Robert Lange, Ann Reynolds, Jessica Velamans
 DRAMA SERIES Carnviale "Insomnia" (HBO) Producers: Daniel Knauf, Howard Klein, Ronald D. Moore, Henry Bromwell, Kelly McCarthy, Scot Winant
 ACTOR DRAMA SERIES Miguel Ferrar Crossing Jordan "Second Chances"
 ACTRESS DRAMA SERIES Adrienne Barbeau Carnivàle "Day of the Dead"
 REALITY SERIES "E! The True Hollywood Story, Heather Mills McCartney" Producers: William Neal, Wendy Quinn
 FILM OR TV SHOW DIRECTED BY A WOMAN Shona Auerbach Dear Frankie
 FEATURE FILM SOMETHING'S GOTTA GIVE (Waverly Films, Columbia Pictures) Director: Nancy Meyers, Writer: Nancy Meyers, Producers: Bruce A. Block, Suzanne Farwell, Nancy Meyers
 ACTOR FEATURE FILM Jack Nicholson Something's Gotta Give
 ACTRESS FEATURE FILM Cate Blanchett The Missing

The WIN Awards 2005
Kathy Griffin hosted The WIN Awards 2005. Christine Lahti, Andrea Parker, Amy Davidson, Lainie Kazan, Gurinder Chadha, Dan Wieden, Lu Chekowsky, Maureen Shirreff, Jennifer Hall, Lindsay Crouse and Danielle Panabaker were among the presenters, and its nominated actors, directors, writers and producers celebrated for having created outstanding work that dispelled stereotypes of women.

Gurinder Chadha picked up the Chaplin Limelight Award for directing presented by Charlie Chaplin's granddaughter Kiera Chaplin for whom this award was created. The animated series Kim Possible and Kathy Najimy also won this same award two years later.

Winners
 ANIMATION SERIES Avatar "Imprisoned" (Nickelodeon) Director: Dave Filoni, Writer: Matt Hubbard, Producers: Michael Dante DiMartino, Bryan Konietzko, Aaron Ehaz
 ACTRESS IN ANIMATION SERIES: Cheryl Chase All Grown Up ""Lucky 13"
 ACTOR IN ANIMATION SERIES: Chad Doreck My Life as a Teenage Robot ""Future Shock/Humiliation 101""
 COMEDY SERIES: 8 Simple Rules "School Nurse"
 ACTRESS COMEDY SERIES Andrea Parker Less Than Perfect "Ignoring Lydia"
 ACTOR COMEDY SERIES Brad Garrett Everybody Loves Raymond ""Sister-In-Law"
 MADE FOR TV MOVIES / MINI SERIES Lackawanna Blues
 ACTRESS MADE FOR TV MOVIES / MINI SERIES Christine Lahti Revenge of the Middle Aged Woman
 ACTOR MADE FOR TV MOVIES / MINI SERIES Ed Harris Empire Falls
 DOCUMENTARY FILM FERRY TALES
 NEWS SERIES Primetime Live: Talking to Animals:Temple Grandin
 DRAMA SERIES LAS VEGAS "Blood is Thicke"
 ACTRESS DRAMA SERIES Molly Parker Deadwood "Requiem For a Gleet"
 ACTOR DRAMA SERIES: Hugh Laurie House "Damned If You Do"
 REALITY SERIES:  Dr. Phil ""Takes on Abusers"
 FILM DIRECTED BY A WOMAN Lindsay Crystal MY UNCLE BERNS
 TELEVISION PRODUCED BY A WOMAN Linda Ellerbee Inside TV Land: Primetime Politics
 FEATURE FILM: Flight Plan (Buena Vista Pictures)
 ACTRESS FEATURE FILM: Claire Danes Shop Girl
 ACTOR FEATURE FILM: Jake Gyllenhaal Proof

The WIN Awards 2006
Held at UCLA, Senator Barbara Boxer accepted The Woman of The Year Honor. British actress Helen Mirren won two WIN tributes which actress Katie Holmes accepted on her behalf.

Event co-chairs were Martha Luttrell, Jane Fonda and Susan Sarandon.

Harry Shearer hosted; American Idol Ace Young performed.

Winners
 Made for Television Movie / Mini-Series Mrs. Harris
 Actress Mini-Series or Made For Television Movie Helen Mirren Elizabeth I
 Actor Mini-Series or Made For Television Movie Robert Carlyle Human Trafficking
 Comedy Series The Office
 Actress Comedy Series Jenna Fischer The Office
 Actor Comedy Series Clark Gregg The New Adventures Of Old Christine
 Documentary Film Born Into Brothels
 Film or Show Produced By a Woman Cheryl Hines, Christen Sussin, Carrie Aizley Campus Ladies
 Film or Show Directed By a Woman Phyllis Nagy Mrs. Harris
 Reality Series Mo'Nique's Fat Chance
 Drama Series The Closer
 Actress Drama Series Mary McDonnell Battlestar Galactica
 Actor Drama Series Bill Paxton Big Love
 Feature Film Water
 Actress Feature Film Helen Mirren The Queen
 Actor Feature Film Ralph Fiennes  The Constant Gardener

The WIN Awards 2007
Held at The Pacific Design Center, Diane Ladd accepted her Lifetime Achievement Award. Frances Fisher presented.
 Angelina Jolie accepted (via a pre-taped speech) best actress in a feature film award for A Mighty Heart.
 Army Wives star Sally Pressman and Tracee Ellis Ross co-hosted.
 Honorees Janet Kestin and Nancy Vonk, Co-Chief Creatives, Ogilvy-Toronto accepted an inaugural Harriett Abbott Advertising Award.
 Though awards for male actors are no longer given, Seth Rogen won a best actor award for Knocked Up. Rogen also picked up a trophy on behalf of his Knocked Up film producer, Shauna Robertson. Alec Baldwin won for 30 Rock.

Winners:
 Made For Television Movie / Mini-Series A Girl Like Me: The Gwen Araujo Story
 Actress Made For Television Movie / Mini-Series Andrea Bowen Girl Posi+ive
 Actor Made For Television Movie / Mini-Series Wendell Pierce Life Support
 Comedy Series Ugly Betty "I'm Coming Out"
 Actress Comedy Series Ashley Jensen Extras
 Actor Comedy Series Alec Baldwin 30 Rock "Hardball"
 Documentary Film  Thin
 Film or Show Produced by a Woman Shauna Robertson Knocked Up
 Film or Show Directed by a Woman Rory Kennedy Ghosts of Abu Ghraib
 Actress Animation Series Kathy Najimy King Of The Hill
 Reality Series Kimora: Life In The Fab Lane
 Drama Series  Army Wives "A Tribe Is Born"
 Actress Drama Series Connie Britton Friday Night Lights
 Actor Drama Series Taylor Kitsch Friday Night Lights
 Actress Feature Film Angelina Jolie A Mighty Heart
 Actor Feature Film Seth Rogen Knocked Up
 Feature Film  A Mighty Heart

The WIN Awards 2008
WIN honored Cloris Leachman with its Living Legend Tribute and added interactive awards (video games) for the first time.

WIN honored INTERACTIVE LIVING LEGEND Mary Dolaher.

Patty Smyth and her band Scandal performed.

Comic Judy Tenuta hosted and Tig Notaro also performed.

Presenters:Timothy Bottoms, Rick Overton, Hannah Simone, Bob Carrigan, John Savage, Sean Young, Diane English, Annie Wersching, Keith David, Eric Roberts. Annie Wersching at Women's Image Network 2009 WIN Awards - Arrivals | TopNews

The WIN Awards 2008 Winners
 Outstanding Made for Television Movie Wisegal
 Actress Made for Television Movie / Mini-Series Kathleen Robertson Tin Man
 Comedy Series The New Adventures Of Old Christine "Beauty Is Only Spanx Deep"
 Actress Comedy Series Julia Louis-Dreyfus The New Adventures Of Old Christine
 Documentary Film Autism: The Musical
 Interactive (Video Game) Tomb Raider: Underworld
 Outstanding Show or Film Produced By a Woman Sheila Griffiths Real Time with Bill Maher
 Film or Show Directed By a Woman Lisa Jackson The Greatest Silence: Rape In The Congo
 Reality Series High School Confidential
 Drama Series Private Practice
 Actress Drama Series Dianne Wiest In Treatment
 Feature Film The Women
 Actress Feature Film Meryl Streep Mamma Mia!

Presenters: Timothy Bottoms, Rick Overton, Hannah Simone, Bob Carrigan, Diane English, Annie Wersching, Keith David, Eric Roberts

The WIN Awards 2009
The Career Achievement Honoree was The Hollywood Reporter editor Elizabeth Guider.

Winners
 Mini-Series / Made for Television Movie Grey Gardens (HBO)
 Actress Made for Television Movie / Mini-Series Marcia Gay Harden The Courageous Heart of Irena Sendler
 Film Or Show Directed By A Woman Anne Fletcher The Proposal
 Documentary Film  Kick Like A Girl (HBO)
 Reality Series Ruby (Style)
 Interactive (Video Game)  The SIMS 3 (Electronic Arts)
 Drama Series Medium "Then...and Again" (CBS/NBC)
 Actress Drama Series Glenn Close Damages
 Feature Film Whip It (Fox Searchlight)
 Actress Feature Film Sandra Bullock The Proposal
 Independent Film Best of Fest Short Film Award Inside Director, Tracie Laymon
 Best of Fest Documentary Film Award Women Behind The Camera Director: Alexis Krasilovsky
 Best of Fest Feature Film Award  Leftovers Director: Robin Nations

The WIN Awards 2010
This was a big awards show year for The WIN awards as WIN created two new Lifetime Achievement awards. These recipients were Suzanne Roberts and Dame Elizabeth Taylor. Elizabeth Taylor friend Mickey Rooney accepted this "Living Legend" award to celebrate Taylor's lifetime work in Hollywood and her charity work advancing HIV/AIDS activism.

The 2010 WIN Awards also honored Suzanne Roberts for her many career achievements. Her sons, Douglas Roberts and Brian L. Roberts (chairman of Comcast and NBC/Universal), and her husband, Ralph J. Roberts, presented to Mrs. Roberts.

Produced at The Broad Stage, Wendy Liebman hosted.

Glee, Claire Danes, Sally Hawkins, Jennifer Aniston, Diane Lane, Joey King, Selena Gomez, Jane Lynch, Susan Sarandon and Maggie Smith were among the many WIN Awards nominees.

Show presenters included: Carl Reiner, Lea Thompson, AJ Michalka, John Savage (actor), Sean Young, Sara Rue, Kahi Lee, and Sally Kirkland.
 HONOREES Elizabeth Taylor: Living Legend Honoree and presenter, Mickey Rooney.  In addition, Suzanne Roberts, wife of Ralph Roberts (owner of Comcast), mother to Brian L. Roberts, presented her with WIN's Lifetime Achievement award for her long career of patronage of the arts.
 "I am honored to be recognized by the Women's Image Network tonight. I applaud the work of Phyllis Stuart in promoting gender parity and fostering creative opportunity throughout our industry. I have been fortunate throughout my career, but never more so than when I was able to use my fame to raise funds and awareness for the HIV/AIDS crisis, work which remains my singular focus. I am touched to be included among WIN's honorees and so gratified to know my efforts are appreciated. Although I am not able to join you for tonight's awards ceremony, please know I am with you in spirit. Each and every one of you here tonight is making a generous contribution to our community. Through your courage to act and your willingness to share, you provide a vital, effective link for women and girls throughout our industry. I am grateful for this honor, and thank you from the bottom of my heart. Sincerely, Elizabeth Taylor"Winners: Television Produced By A Woman Alexis Martin Woodall Glee
 Film / Show Directed By A Woman Elizabeth Allen Ramona And Beezus
 Mini-Series / Made for Television Movie Temple Grandin
 Film Produced By A Woman Bonnie Arnold How To Train Your Dragon
 Television Produced By A Woman Alexis Martin Woodall Glee
 Reality Series Kimora: Life in the Fab Lane "Labor of Love"
 Comedy Series Hung
 Actress Comedy Series Cheryl Hines Curb Your Enthusiasm "Seinfeld"
 Drama Series Janet Tamaro Rizzoli & Isles (Creator/Executive Producer)
 Actress Drama Series Sasha Alexander Rizzoli & Isles
 Film / Show Directed By A Woman Elizabeth Allen Ramona And Beezus
 Actress Feature Film Helena Bonham Carter Alice In Wonderland
 Feature Film How To Train Your Dragon

The Women's Image Awards 13
 Hosted by Rick Overton; presenters included Malin Åkerman, Josh Stamberg, Sally Kirkland, Sharon Lawrence. Lili Haydn and her band performed.Winners Made For TV Movie / Mini Series Mildred Pierce (HBO)  A Killer Films / John Wells Production in association with Metro-Goldwyn-Mayer and HBO Miniseries; Directed by: Todd Haynes; Teleplay by: Todd Haynes, Jon Raymond; Based on the Novel by: James M. Cain; Executive Producers: John Wells, Todd Haynes, Christine Vachon, Pamela Koffler; Co-Executive Producer: Ilene S. Landress
 Actress Made for Television Movie Diane Lane Cinema Verite
 Documentary Film Triangle: Remembering The Fire (Blowback Productions for HBO Documentary Films); Directed by: Daphne Pinkerson; Produced by Daphne Pinkerson and Marc Levin; Written by Michael Hirsch, Richard Lowe and Daphne Pinkerson; Edited by Richard Lowe & Christopher K. Walker; Line Producer: Kara Rozansky, "Scenes from "The Triangle Factory Fire Scandal" Directed by Mel Stuart; Senior Producer: Nancy Abraham (For HBO); Executive Producer: Sheila Nevins (For HBO); Narrated by Tovah Feldshuh
 Film / Show Directed By a Woman Liz Garbus  Bobby Fischer Against The World  (HBO)  Moxie Firecracker, HBO Documentary Films and LM Media; Director: Liz Garbus Producers: Stanley Buchthal, Liz Garbus, Matthew Justus, Rory Kennedy; Executive Producers: Dan Cogan, Nick Fraser, Maja Hoffmann, Martin Pieper, Sheila Nevins (HBO); Senior Producer: Nancy Abraham (HBO); Co-Producers: Christoph Jorg, David Koh
 Film / Show Produced By a Woman Bette Midler: The Showgirl Must Go On (HBO) Encanto Enterprises and Funny Business in association with HBO Entertainment; Executive Producer: Bette Midler:Producers: Bette Midler, Seanne Farmer; Writers: Bette Midler, Eric Kornfeld, Bruce Vilanch (Additional Material);Choreography, Toni Basil; Original Stage Production Conceived and Directed by: Bette Midler
 Drama Series Private Practice  "Did You Hear What Happened to Charlotte King?" (ABC)  Mark Gordon Company, Shondaland; Creator: Shonda Rhimes; Written by: Shonda Rhimes,Directed by: Allison Liddi-Brown; Executive Producers: Mark Tinker, Craig Turk, Steve Blackman, Shonda Rhimes, Betsy Beers, Mark R. Gordon; Co-Executive Producers: Jennifer Cecil, Barbie Kligman, Ann Kindberg; Supervising Producers: Fred Einesman, Ayanna Floyd-Ohl; Producers: Hans Van Doornewaard, Karen Wyscarver, Sanford Golden; Co-Producers: Chris Van Dusen, David Glazier
 Actress Drama Series Anna Paquin True Blood "She's Not There" (HBO)
 Comedy Series Drop Dead Diva (Lifetime, Sony Pictures Television, Storyline Entertainment); Executive Producers: Josh Berman, Craig Zadan, Neil Meron, Alex Taub; Co-Executive Producers: Bob Wilson and Jamie Babbit; Consulting Producers: Amy Engelberg, Wendy Engelberg and Bill Fordes
 Actress Comedy Series Brooke Elliott Drop Dead Diva
 Actress Feature Film Vera Farmiga Higher Ground
 Feature Film Higher Ground (Sony Pictures Classics)

The Women's Image Awards 14
Style from the 14th Annual Women's Image Network (WIN) Awards

WIN Humanitarian Honoree was producer, writer and arts patron Maria Arena Bell, which Lisa KudrowFriends presented.
Show co-hosts were Melissa Peterman, Bruce Vilanch. The presenters included Beverly Johnson, Nadine Velazquez, and Ace Young. Singer, Diana DeGarmo, an American Idol winner, performed and presented. The WIN Awards 2012 were produced at The Paramount Theater on Paramount Studios.

The WIN Awards 2012 were produced at The Paramount Theater on Paramount Studios. Actress Lisa Kudrow presented to Humanitarian Honoree, producer and philanthropist Maria Arena Bell.Winners Comedy Series Veep (HBO)
 Actress Comedy Series Whitney Cummings Whitney
 Made For Television Movie Game Change
 Actress Made For Television Movie Nicole Kidman Hemingway & Gellhorn
 Film / Show Directed By A Woman Susanna White Boardwalk Empire "A Dangerous Maid"
 Documentary Film About Face Supermodels Then and Now (HBO) Directed by Timothy Greenfield-Sanders.
 Film / Show Written By A Woman Raelle Tucker True Blood "Whatever I am, You Made Me".
 Film / Show Produced By A Woman Jennifer Aniston, Paula Wagner, Marta Kauffman, Kristin Hahn, Nellie Nugiel, Francesca Silvestri - Five
 Reality Series Pit Bills and Parolees "Heart Broken" Animal Planet
 Drama Series Smash (NBC)
 Actress Drama Series Katharine McPhee Smash
 Advertising Campaign "Mean Stinks"

The Women's Image Awards 15
Grammy winner David Foster and Ruben Studdard performed at The WIN Awards. Cecilia DeMille Presley grand daughter to Cecil DeMille, Ambassador Swanee Hunt and Rosalind Jarrett were all honored, while Oprah and Kerry Washington were nominees, among others. Presenters included Anne Heche, Collette Burson, Kelsey Scott, Yolanda Foster, Kathy Connell (SAG AWARDS), Carlos Gomez and Kearann Giovanni.
Honroee Ambassador Swanee Hunt Arrival
In 2012, WIN approached its gender parity goal with humor by creating a logline SEE US IN 3D, NOT JUST DOUBLE D, which many WIN nominees recorded including Selena Gomez and Jane Lynch. Because if women and girls are portrayed well in the media, girls and women everywhere may one day be well-treated. The Women's Image Awards 2013 The Women's Image Awards 16 

The show opened with a posthumous Joan Rivers tribute and featured guest comics Brittany Furlan and T. J. Miller who discussed and demonstrated how Joan influenced their comedy. WIN also honored filmmakers Lauren Paul and Molly Thompson, with its first Community Service tribute for having created Finding Kind, a documentary film about middle school female bullying. Their film launched a movement and school program based upon the powerful belief in KINDness, that brings awareness and healing to the negative and lasting effects of girl-against-girl crime. Wife of Breaking Bad star Aaron Paul, Lauren was bullied in middle school and contemplated suicide.

In 2014, Grey's Anatomy star, Chandra Wilson won a directing award. Julia Roberts, Whoopi Goldberg and Cicely Tyson were nominees. Melissa Rivers, (who was also nominated as a producer) attended to accept a posthumous WIN award for her mother, Joan Rivers, who competed and won in the OUTSTANDING REALITY SERIES category for Fashion Police. Fashion designer Sophie Simmons collaborated with WIN to promote self-confidence with her Twitter campaign, 'Send Us Your Selfie' which advanced fashion as means for self-esteem. Baroness Kimberly Moore received its Humanitarian Honor. Writer Caprice Crane (daughter of Tina Louise (Gilligan's Island)) and comic Gary Shapiro, co-hosted.Film & Television Nominees & WinnersDocumentary Film RUNNING FROM CRAZY (OWN)
 WINNER PRIVATE VIOLENCE (HBO Documentary Films)
 E! ENTERTAINMENT SPECIAL: BROOKE BURKET-CHARVET (E! Entertainment)
 BEYOND CANDID WITH GIULANA: DEMI LOVATO (E! Entertainment)Comedy Series MELISSA & JOEY "Right Time, Right Place" (ABC FAMILY)
 WINNER NEW GIRL "All In" (FOX) 
 GETTING ON "Born On The Fourth Of July" (HBO) 
 MODERN FAMILY "Under Pressure" (FOX)Actress Comedy Series Joan Rivers FASHION POLICE "September Issue"
 Julie Bowen MODERN FAMILY "Under Pressure"
 Zooey Deschanel NEW GIRL "The Last Wedding"
 WINNER Julia Louis-Dreyfus VEEP "Crate"Made For Television Movie / Mini-Series A DAY LATE AND A DOLLAR SHORT (Lifetime)
 THE TRIP TO BOUNTIFUL (Lifetime)
 WINNER AMERICAN HORROR STORY: COVEN (FX Networks)
 FARGO (FX Networks)Actress Made For Television Movie / Mini-Series Julia Roberts THE NORMAL HEART
 Whoopi Goldberg A DAY LATE AND A DOLLAR SHORT
 Cicely Tyson THE TRIP TO BOUNTIFUL
 WINNER Michelle Trachtenberg KILLING KENNEDY
 Emma Roberts AMERICAN HORROR STORY: COVEN
 Allison Tolman FARGOReality Series IYANLA: FIX MY LIFE "Fix My Football Star Life" (OWN)
 VICE "The Pink Gang Rebellion" (HBO)
 WINNER COLD JUSTICE "Gone" (TNT) 
 WELCOME TO SWEETIE PIE'S "Fools Rush In" (OWN)
 TOTAL DIVAS "Wedding Mania" (E! Entertainment)Actress Reality Series Heidi Klum PROJECT RUNWAY
 WINNER Giuliana Rancic GIULIANA & BILL
 Yolanda Foster REAL HOUSEWIVES OF BEVERLY HILLS
 Chelsea Handler CHELSEA LATELYDrama Series WINNER SCANDAL "Guess Who's Coming To Dinner" (ABC) 
 BATES MOTEL "The Immutable Truth" (A&E) 
 SWITCHED AT BIRTH "Uprising" (ABC Family)
 THE FOSTERS "I Do" (ABC Family) 
 WITCHES OF EAST END "Pilot" (Lifetime) 
 SLEEPY HOLLOW "Pilot" (20th Century Fox Television)Actress Drama Series Diane Kruger THE BRIDGE "Pilot"
 WINNER Lena Headey GAME OF THRONES "The Lion And The Rose"
 Vera Farmiga BATES MOTEL "The Immutable Truth"
 Katheryn Winnick VIKINGS "Unforgiven"
 Katey Sagal SONS OF ANARCHY "A Mother's Work"Film Produced By a Woman WINNER Mary Lisio, Teri Weinberg KILLING KENNEDY
 Barbara Kopple RUNNING FROM CRAZY
 Ann Druyan COSMOS: A SPACE TIME ODYSSEY
 Cynthia Hill PRIVATE VIOLENCEDrama Series Produced By a Woman Shonda Rhimes, Betsy Beers SCANDAL "Guess Who's Coming To Dinner"
 Becky Hartman Edwards, Anne Keeney, Lizzy Weiss, Joy Gregory SWITCHED AT BIRTH "Uprising"
 Susanna Fogel, Joni Lefkowitz CHASING LIFE "Pilot"
 Kerry Ehrin BATES MOTEL "The Immutable Truth"
 Meredith Stiehm THE BRIDGE "Pilot"
 WINNERS Joanna Johnson, Jennifer Lopez, Elaine Goldsmith-Thomas, Christine Sacani THE FOSTERS "I Do"Comedy Series Produced By a Woman Paula Hart, Melissa Joan Hart, Jennifer Glickman MELISSA & JOEY "Right Time, Right Place"
 Kathryn Takis, Pam Healey, Lisa Shannon ERIC & JESSIE: GAME ON "Episode 206"
 WINNERs Lisa Bacon, Melissa Rivers FASHION POLICE "September Issue"Comedy Series Directed By A Woman Allison Liddi-Brown SCANDAL "Guess Who's Coming To Dinner"
 Becky Martin VEEP "Fishing"
 Nancy Hower QUICK DRAW "Wedding Bells"
 WINNER Alisa Statman MODERN FAMILY "The Wedding Part 2"Drama Series Directed By A Woman Zetna Fuentes SWITCHED AT BIRTH "Have You Really The Courage"
 WINNER Chandra WilsonGREY'S ANATOMY "Do You Know"
 Heather Mitchell SCANDAL "Guess Who's Coming To Dinner"
 Lesli Linka Glatter THE NEWSROOM "Willie Pete"

Drama Series Written By A Woman
 Lizzy Weiss SWITCHED AT BIRTH "Uprising"
 Joanna Johnson THE FOSTERS "Vigil"
 Nkechi Okoro-Carroll BONES "The Ghost In The Killer"
 WINNER Stacy McKee GREY'S ANATOMY "Do You Know"

Comedy Series Written By A Woman
 Lena Dunham GIRLS "Two Plane Rides"
 Elaine Ko MODERN FAMILY "Under Pressure"
 Heidi Clements BABY DADDY "The Bet"
 Jennifer Glickman MELISSA & JOEY "Right Time, Right Place"
 Megan Ganz MODERN FAMILY "The Wedding Part 2"
 WINNERS Liz Meriwether, Kay Cannon NEW GIRL "Nerd"

Feature Film
 Belle Still Alice Gone Girl WINNER WildActress in a Feature Film
 Gugu Mbatha Raw Belle Annette Bening The Face of Love Julianne Moore Still Alice Rosamund Pike Gone Girl WINNER Reese Witherspoon WildThe Women's Image Awards 17

The 17th Women's Image Awards ceremony was held at Royce Hall UCLA on February 10, 2016. Philanthropist and activist Irena Medavoy and documentary filmmaker Abigail Disney both accepted Woman of the Year tributes.

The Starz series Outlander  received five nominations, including a nomination in the Drama Series category. Caitriona Balfe, who plays the leading character in the show, also received a nomination in the Actress Drama Series category.

Fox Searchlight's He Named Me Malala also received two nominations, including Best Documentary and Best Producer. Fox Searchlight also received nominations for Mistress America, Far from the Madding Crowd, Me and Earl and the Dying Girl, and Brooklyn. Twentieth Century Fox received nominations for New Girl, Modern Family, Empire, and Fresh Off the Boat. National Geographic received a nomination for a role played by Emmanuelle Chriqu in Killing Jesus.

Hosted by Carol Leifer, other guests included honorees, Irena Medavoy and filmmaker, Abigail Disney,  who is the "Armor of Light" director, who said at the show: "It's time for women to start asserting themselves in media. The filmmaker, One of the Women's Image Awards' Women of the Year, says women need to work together and promote each other in order to overcome the challenges facing women in the entertainment industry and in society as a whole".

The film, MAKERS: Women Who Make America won in its Outstanding Documentary Category. Women's Image Award: Outstanding Documentary for MAKERS: Women Who Make America

Other guests included Yue-Sai Kan, Francesca Eastwood, Frances Fisher, Joyce Giraud, Breeda Wool, Sam Elliott, Mark Steines, Mark Burnett, Roma Downey, Nzingha Stewart, Marti Noxon, Olivia d'Abo, Quincy, Catherine Bach, Ronald. T. Moore Felicity Huffman, Jennifer (Flavin) Stallone, Joely Fisher, Lisa Edelstein, Lily Tomlin Xriss Jor, Cheryl Hines and Rosanna Arquette,

 BODYTRAFFIC dancers performed.

Quincy Jones' client, rising Jordanian singer, Xriss Jor sang a Michael Jackson song.

The Women's Image Awards 17 Nominees & Winners:

The Women's Image Awards 18

Courage Award honoree (posthumously): Carrie Fisher

Humanitarian Award honoree: Anne Archer

Unity Award honoree: Karen Sharpe-Kramer

Nominees and winners:

Documentary Film
 THE EAGLE HUNTRESS WINNER
 DARK HORSE (Sony Pictures Classics)
 WOMEN OF HONOR with Special Guests Michelle Obama and Jill Biden (Lifetime)
 HE NAMED ME MALALA (National Geographic Channel)

Comedy Series
 Crazy Ex-Girlfriend WINNER
 Girlfriends' Guide to Divorce Younger Casual Survivor's RemorseActress Comedy Series
 Lisa Edelstein, Girlfriends' Guide to Divorce WINNER
 Erica Ash, Survivor's Remorse Sutton Foster, Younger Rachel Bloom, Crazy Ex-Girlfriend Michaela Watkins, CasualMade For Television Movie/Miniseries
 Fargo (FX)
 11.22.63 (Hulu)
 Flesh and Bone (STARZ) WINNER
 The Girlfriend Experience (STARZ)
 American Horror Story: Hotel (FX)

Actress Made For Television Movie/Miniseries
 Jean Smart, Fargo WINNER
 Riley Keough, The Girlfriend Experience Anika Noni Rose, Roots Kirsten Dunst, Fargo Sarah Hay, Flesh and BoneReality Series
 I Am Jazz, (TLC) WINNER
 Sisterhood of Hip Hop, (Oxygen Media)
 Total Divas, (E! Entertainment)
 Good Bones, (HGTV)

Actress Reality Series
 The Bella Twins Total Divas WINNER
 Karen E Laine, Good Bones Joanna Gaines, Fixer Upper Jazz Jennings, I Am Jazz Mina Starsiak, Good BonesDrama Series
 UnREAL "Insurgent" (Lifetime)
 The Americans "Persona Non Grata" (FX)
 The Path "The Miracle" (Hulu)
 Outlander(Starz) WINNER

Actress Drama Series
 Rhea Seehorn Better Call Saul "Switch" WINNER
 Vera Farmiga Bates Motel "Forever"
 Constance Zimmer UnREAL "Fugitive"
 Caitriona Balfe Outlander "Vengeance Is Mine"
 Michelle Monaghan The Path "The Miracle"

Film or Show Produced By a Woman
 Jessica Goldberg Michelle Lee The Path WINNER
 Gina Matthews Teri Weinberg Saints & Strangers Bridget Carpenter 11.23.63 Stacey Reiss Sharon Chang The Eagle HuntressFilm or Show Written By a WomanFilm Rebecca Miller Maggie's Plan Lorene Scafaria The Meddler Amy Fox (Screenplay by), Sarah Megan Thomas, Alysia Reiner, Amy Fox (Story by) Equity WINNER
 Maren Ade Toni ErdmannShow Lauren Houseman, Rachelle R. Williams Survivor's Remorse WINNER
 Amy Seimetz The Girlfriend Experience
 Diana Gabaldon Outlander
 Bridget Carpenter 11.23.63
 Jessica Goldberg The Path
 Moira Walley-Beckett Flesh and Bone

Films and Shows Directed By a Woman

Film
 Louise Osmond Dark Horse WINNER Janet Grillo Jack of the Red Hearts
 Meera Menon Equity
 Rebecca Miller Maggie's Plan

Show
 Helen Shaver Vikings "Yol" WINNER Shiri Appleby UnREAL "Casualty"
 Millicent Shelton Survivor's Remorse "Mystery Team"
 Amy Seimetz The Girlfriend Experience "Provocation"
 Larysa Kondracki Power "Don't Worry Baby"Feature Film ELLE (Sony Pictures Classics)
 EQUITY (Sony Pictures Classics)
 THE MEDDLER (Sony Pictures Classics)
 JULIETA (Sony Pictures Classics) WINNERActress Feature Film Isabelle Huppert Elle WINNER Anna Gunn Equity
 Emma Suárez Julieta
 Adriana Ugarte Julieta

19th Women's Image Awards

20th Women's Image AwardsMade For Television Movie / Limited Series Little Women "Part 2" Winner
 Howards End "Episode 3"
 Cocaine Godmother: The Griselda Blanco Story
 The Girlfriend Experience "Erica & Anna: Freefall"
 Faith Under Fire: The Antoinette Tuff StoryActress Made For Television Movie / Limited Series Catherine Zeta-Jones Cocaine Godmother: The Griselda Blanco Story
 Carmen Ejogo The Girlfriend Experience "Bria: Making Amends"* Maya Hawke Little Women Winner
 Hayley Atwell Howards End "Episode 3"
 Sara Bareilles Jesus Christ Superstar Live In Concert 
 Emily Watson Little WomenComedy Series Grown-ish "It's Hard Out There For A Pimp"
 Sweetbitter "Now Your Tongue is Coded"
 American Housewife "Field Day" * The Bold Type "Feminist Army" Winner
 Vida "Episode 6"Actress Comedy Series Katie Stevens The Bold Type "The Domino Effect"
 Julianna Margulies Dietland "Tender Belly"
 Ella Purnell Sweetbitter "Simone's"* Caitlin FitzGerald Sweetbitter "Simone's" Winner 
 Yara Shahidi Grown-ish "It's Hard Out There For A Pimp"
 Joy Nash Dietland "Tender Belly"Show Written by A Woman Heidi Thomas Little Women
 Kelly Souders Genius "Chapter Three" * Tanya Saracho Vida "Episode 6" WinnerShow Directed by A Woman Hettie Macdonald Howards End "Episode 3"
 Vanessa Caswill Little Women (Part 2)
 Jennifer Getzinger Counterpart "No Man's Land- Part 2"
 Alice Jones One Strange Rock "Home"* Millicent Shelton Preacher "Coffin" WinnerFilm Written By a Woman Nicole Holofcener Can You Ever Forgive Me? 
 Diablo Cody Tully
 Shana Feste Boundaries * Jane Anderson The Wife Winner
 Chloe Zhao The RiderFilm Directed by A Woman* Rory Kennedy Above And Beyond: NASA's Journey To Tomorrow Winner
 Nadine Labaki Capernaum 
 Shana Feste Boundaries 
 Mimi Leder On The Basis of Sex 
 Josie Rourke Mary Queen of ScotsFilm Produced by a Woman Diablo Cody, Charlize Theron, Beth Kono, Helen Estabrook Tully* Leslie Urdang The Seagull  Winner 
 Debra Hayward Mary Queen of Scots 
 Anne Carey, Amy Nauiokas Can You Ever Forgive Me?
 Mollye Asher, Chloe Zhao The RiderShow Produced by a Woman* Jane Root One Strange Rock "Home"  Winner
 Dede Gardner, Stephanie Danler, Sarah Esberg Sweetbitter "Now Your Tongue is Coded"
 Susie Liggat Little Women
 Amy Berg Counterpart "The Crossing"
 Sera Gamble The Magicians "Six Short Stories About Magic"
 Danielle Franco, Nomi Ernst Leidner, Adri Murguia, Karley Sciortino, Gena Konstantakos Slutever "Happy Endings"Reality Series America Inside Out With Katie Couric "Inside the Revolt"
 Unapologetic with Aisha Tyler
 Total Bellas "The Bella Comeback"* Citizen Rose WinnerActress Reality Series Rose McGowan Citizen Rose* Nikki Bella Total Bellas Winner
 Khloé Kardashian Revenge Body with Khloe KardashianDocumentary Film* What Haunts Us Winner                                                                                                                                                                       * Jane                                                                                                                                                                                               * He Lied About Everything                                                                                                                                               * Wasted! The Story of Food WasteDrama Series Grey's Anatomy "Don't Fear The Reaper"* Scandal "Over A Cliff" Winner
 Code Black "Cabin Pressure"
 How to Get Away with Murder "Lahey V. Commonwealth of Pennsylvania"
 Once Upon a Time "Chosen"
 Quantico "No Place Is Home"
 Power "Everyone Is Implicated"Actress Drama Series Samantha Colley Genius "Chapter Four"* Rhea Seehorn Better Call Saul "Breathe" Winner
 Katheryn Winnick Vikings "Moments of Vision"
 Olivia Munn Six "Ghosts"
 Danai Gurira Walking Dead "Honor"Feature Film The Hate U Give* On The Basis of Sex Winner
 Mary Queen of Scots
 Capernaum
 Boundaries
 Can You Ever Forgive Me?Lead Actress Feature Film* Glenn Close The Wife Winner
 Kelly Macdonald Puzzle 
 Melissa McCarthy Can You Ever Forgive Me? 
 Saoirse Ronan Mary Queen of Scots 
 Felicity Jones On The Basis of Sex 
 Amandla Stenberg The Hate U GiveSupporting Actress Feature Film Kathy Bates On The Basis of Sex 
 Margot Robbie Queen of Scots * Regina Hall The Hate U Give'''  Winner
 Cailee Spaeny On The Basis of Sex 
 Mackenzie Davis Tully 
 Tika Sumpter The Old Man & The Gun''

21st Women's Image Awards

The Women's Image Awards 21 Nominees & Winners

22nd Women's Image Awards

The Women's Image Awards 22 Nominees & Winners

Vikings Star Katheryn Winnick Celebrates as She Scoops WIN Award 

Outlander notes: Caitriona Balfe's gin arrives & another honor

23rd Women's Image Awards
Honorees were Helen Shaver its Living Legend recipient and JoJo Siwa its inaugural Rising Musical Star recipient.

Celebrating Helen Shaver & JoJo Siwa at the 23rd Women's Image Awards -- WIN Announces Its Honorees & 18 Film & Television Nominee Categories

While attending The Women's Image Network's 23rd Women's Image Awards at The Saban Theater in Beverly Hills Thursday, Chung opened up to PEOPLE exclusively about wanting to return for a Real World: San Diego reunion.

Marvel’s new release ‘Black Widow’ leaves superhero fans with mixed emotions

	 Women's Image Network ANNOUNCES its 23rd WOMEN’S IMAGE AWARDS FILM & TELEVISION NOMINEES

Women could reach their full potential when all media depicts girls and women as complex and ever-evolving human beings.

To advance the value of women and girls, since its 1993 founding Women's Image Network, (WIN), has produced The Women's Image Awards to celebrate artists whose work depicts dimensional female media images.
The Women's Image Awards 23 Nominees 

New mother of twins Jamie Chung served as one of 10 presenters.

The Women's Image Awards 24

The Woman of The Year Honoree Mira Sorvino                        The 24th Women’s Image Awards Winners Including Academy Award Winner Mira Sorvino as Woman of the Year Honoree

Held at The Saban Theater in Beverly Hills, Oscar-winning actress and activist Mira Sorvino accepted The Woman of The Year Honor. The Persian pop-star Hengameh accepted The Humanitarian Honor for bringing attention to Iran’s first female-led revolution. Comic Cathy Ladman hosted; Grammy winners Opium Moon performed.

The Women's Image Awards 24 Winners & Nominees:

Other charities 
Although Women's Image Network is a 501(c)3 non-profit, it has also supported several other charities including The Mary Magdalene Foundation, Women's Care Cottage, The Mission, Gilda's Club, The American Cancer Society. WIN supports charities whose efforts range from fighting homeless, rehabilitating prostitutes, curing HIV/AIDS and cancer, eliminating poverty, biodiversity conservation and wild animal rescue. In some years, proceeds from the WIN Awards Gala have been used to fund other WIN events, such as in 2006 when the charity created the Day in the Life program designed to mentor at-risk girls.

Women's Image Network Advisory Board
Since its 1993 inception, and founded by filmmaker / actress Phyllis Stuart, Women's Image Network has benefited from guidance from seasoned industry professionals Current (a few former and deceased) WIN Advisory Board members include: Tamara Asseyev, Todd Black, Helen Gurley Brown, David Brown, Blake Edwards, Eizabeth Forsythe-Hailey, Elaine Hastings Edell, Mariette Hartley, Arthur Hiller, Henry Jaglom, Norman Jewison, Alan Landsburg, Sherry Lansing, Lauren Lloyd, Bryan Lourd, Dan Lupovitz, Amanda Mackey Johnson, Laurence Mark, Jayne Meadows, Baroness Kimberly Moore, Peter Newman, Bonnie Palef, Sarah Pillsbury, Polly Platt, Peggy Rajski, Alyse Rosenberg, Fred Schepisi, Linda Shayne, Lauren Shuler Donner, George Stevens Jr., Allyn Stewart, Ellen Travolta and Lili Fini Zanuck.

References

External links
 

American film awards
American television awards
Advertising awards